L. G. "Clayton"/"Clipper" Carmody (1922–1997) was an American football player and coach. He was drafted by the Washington Redskins of the National Football League (NFL) in 1947. Carmody served as the head football coach at Central Washington University from 1950 to 1954, compiling a record of 10–29–1, after having been a professor at the University of Washington.

Head coaching record

References

External links
 

1922 births
Year of death missing
Central Washington Wildcats football coaches
Central Washington Wildcats football players
Columbia University alumni
Players of American football from Nebraska